The Barksdale Global Power Museum (formerly, the 8th Air Force Museum) is an aviation museum run by the United States Air Force on Barksdale Air Force Base near Bossier City, Louisiana. Hosted by the 2nd Bomb Wing, it maintains a large collection of military aircraft and historical artifacts that illuminate the early days of United States military aviation, the Barksdale base, and the formations of the 2nd Bomb Wing and the 8th Air Force.

The museum aims to preserve the heritage and traditions of the Air Force, particularly those of the 2nd Bomb Wing and other bomber units; to stimulate esprit de corps among Air Force personnel; to educate the public about the Air Force; and to ensure proper stewardship of its aircraft, artifacts, and art.

History 
The museum opened in 1979 through the efforts of Buck Rigg, who became the volunteer curator. Work was started to return a B-17 on permanent loan from the United States Air Force Museum to flight. This was followed by restoration of a B-24.

In 1980, two airmen rabbit hunting found the remains of a Keystone B-6A bomber in the woods near the airbase. The wreckage was added to the museum's collection. In 1982, an Avro Vulcan was donated to the museum and later that year plans for recreating a World War II 8th Air Force base were announced. By 1985, the museum had also acquired a B-52, KC-97, C-47, and F-84. A B-29 was added in 1992.

However, an inspection by the National Museum of the United States Air Force in 2008 revealed that collections management procedures were insufficient and the museum was threatened with closure. A rebranding effort led to the museum changing its name in 2012 to become the Barksdale Global Power Museum, to reflect an expanded mission and avoid confusion with the Mighty Eighth Air Force Museum in Savannah, Georgia. The museum completed a three year long renovation in 2015, during which all the rooms were rebuilt and many of the airplanes repainted.

Exhibits 
 2nd Bomb Wing history timeline in artifacts from 1918–present
 Aviation art gallery
 A September 11, 2001, exhibit includes the podium and furniture from the Eighth Air Force Headquarters when U.S. President George W. Bush made the first speech during the terrorist attacks.

Collection

Aircraft 

 Avro Vulcan B.2 XM606
 Beechcraft AT-11 Kansan 42-36887
 Beechcraft UC-45J Expeditor 39266
 Boeing B-47E Stratojet 53-2276
 Boeing B-52D Stratofortress 56-0629
 Boeing B-52G Stratofortress 57-6509
 Boeing KC-97L Stratofreighter 53-240
 Boeing KC-135A Stratotanker 56-3595
 Boeing PB-1W Flying Fortress 77244
 Boeing TB-29 Superfortress 44-87627
 Ford B-24J Liberator 44-48781
 Convair B-58 Hustler – Rocket sled
 Douglas C-47A Skytrain 43-16130
 General Dynamics FB-111A Aardvark 68-0284
 General Dynamics F-111E Aardvark 68-0019 – Escape capsule
 Keystone B-6 – Wreckage
 Lockheed SR-71A Blackbird 61-7967
 Lockheed T-33A 58-0615
 Mikoyan-Gurevich MiG-21F-13
 North American P-51D Mustang Composite
 Republic F-84F Thunderstreak 51-1386

Missiles 

 AGM-28 Hound Dog
 Titan II – Nose cone

References

External links

 Barksdale Global Power Museum web site
 National Museum of the United States Air Force

Aerospace museums in Louisiana
Air force museums in the United States
Military and war museums in Louisiana
Museums in Bossier Parish, Louisiana